The 1909 College Baseball All-Southern Team consists of baseball players selected at their respective positions after the 1909 IAAUS baseball season.

All-Southerns

Key
H = John Heisman's selection.

NT = published in the Nashville Tennessean, meant to be selection of all the various colleges.

References

All-Southern
College Baseball All-Southern Teams